George Wayne Anderson Sr. (July 10, 1863 – December 30, 1922) was a lawyer in Richmond, Virginia who served as a state legislator. In 1899 he was elected to the Virginia House and in 1901 to the Virginia Senate. He served as city attorney for Richmond.

Early life
George Wayne Anderson was born on July 10, 1863 at Edgehill in Albemarle County, Virginia.

Personal life
He married Estelle Marguerite Burthe, a descendant of Dominique Burthe, and they had four children. He had a son George Wayne Anderson Jr. who died in France in 1918.

References

External links
Findagrave entry

1863 births
1922 deaths
People from Albemarle County, Virginia
Members of the Virginia House of Delegates
Virginia state senators
Lawyers from Richmond, Virginia
Politicians from Richmond, Virginia
19th-century American lawyers